Marcelle Mersereau, (born February 14, 1942 in Pointe-Verte, New Brunswick) is a Canadian politician.

A civil servant for most of her career, she also served as a councillor on Bathurst, New Brunswick city council while on the provincial payroll from 1980 to 1991. She resigned her seat on council upon being elected to the Legislative Assembly of New Brunswick in the 1991 provincial election. A member of Frank McKenna's Liberal Party, she was immediately named to cabinet and became deputy premier in 1994. She served in a variety of roles in cabinet until the defeat of the Liberals in the 1999 election. She defeated PC candidate Robert N. Stairs to retain her seat in Bathurst, one of only 10 Liberals to survive what was their worst ever electoral defeat.

In opposition she was a top critic and the media reported she had lost the vote in her caucus to become interim leader of her party by a margin of 4-3 following the resignation of Camille Thériault. Her most high-profile role in opposition was that of finance critic.  She did not seek re-election to the legislature in 2003 but has remained active in her party.  She was elected vice president of the New Brunswick Liberal Association on October 4, 2003 and re-elected on October 15, 2005.  During the 2004 federal election, she was co-chair of the Liberal campaign in New Brunswick. She was the Liberal candidate for the House of Commons of Canada in the riding of Acadie—Bathurst in the 2006 federal election, but finished second to Yvon Godin of the New Democratic Party.

She served as co-chair of the successful Liberal campaign as it prepared for the 2006 provincial election.  She succeeded Greg Byrne as president of the New Brunswick Liberal Party when he resigned after being appointed to the cabinet following the 2006 election and served the post until stepping down in the Fall of 2007.

References 
 List of Women MLAs, New Brunswick Legislative Library

Cabinet

1942 births
Living people
New Brunswick Liberal Association MLAs
Members of the Executive Council of New Brunswick
Women MLAs in New Brunswick
Deputy premiers of New Brunswick
People from Bathurst, New Brunswick
21st-century Canadian politicians
21st-century Canadian women politicians
Women government ministers of Canada